Bryony Hannah (born 1984) is a British actress, best known as Cynthia Miller in BBC One's Call the Midwife.

Personal life
The daughter of a teacher and a retired Royal Navy lieutenant-commander, Hannah comes from Portsmouth, and after leaving school worked in a pub in Southampton. She was then accepted to RADA, having won a Laurence Olivier Bursary.

In 2014, Hannah gave birth to her first child.

Career
Hannah received an Olivier Award Nomination for Best Performance in a Supporting Role for her role as Mary Tilford in The Children's Hour. Several reviews of that production mentioned that Hannah was a "virtual unknown" and "stole the show."

Her other stage roles include performances in Earthquakes in London, Every Good Boy Deserves Favour, The Pillowman, The Merry Wives of Windsor and War Horse. In 2017, she appeared in the posthumous premiere of Olivier Award winner Kevin Elyot's final play Twilight Song, alongside Adam Garcia and Paul Higgins.

She also appeared in Dead Boss as Christine and provided the voice of Padget, Pando's carer, in the CBeebies TV series, Bing.

She is perhaps best known for her work on Call the Midwife. Her character, Nurse Cynthia Miller, was in the initial cast of characters of season one. During the course of the show, Cynthia decided she was being called to a religious life, and she became a nun. Her character lived as a nun at Nonnatus House, where she also worked as a midwife. Hannah left the series after season six.

Filmography

References

External links
 
 Royal Academy of Dramatic Art profile

Living people
English film actresses
English stage actresses
English television actresses
Alumni of RADA
21st-century English actresses
1984 births